Newsboy or news boy may refer to:

 Newspaper hawker, a street vendor of newspapers
 Paperboy or papergirl, youngsters who distributed newspapers to subscribers

People

Nicknames
 Newsboy Brown (1905–1977), American boxer
 Newsboy Moriarity (1910–1979), Irish-American mobster
 Abe the Newsboy (1887–1966), American boxer

Fictional
 Newsboy, a character played by Jeremy Wells on Mikey Havoc's MTV show in New Zealand
 "Newsboy", nickname for Pete, a character in Frenetic Five, a text-adventure series

The arts

Film
 The Newsboy, a 1905 American film

Literature
 The Newsboy, an American 1854 novel by Elizabeth Oakes Smith
 News Boy, a play by Arch Brown featured at the Theatre Rhinoceros in San Francisco, California, U.S.

Music
 Newsboys, an Australian Christian pop/rock band
 "Newsboy", a 1966 single by English pianist Mrs Mills

Paintings
 The Newsboy, an 1889 painting by American George Newell Bowers
 The Newsboy, an 1879 painting by English painter Ralph Hedley
 The Newsboy, an 1869 painting by Canadian-American Edward Mitchell Bannister
 The News Boy, an 1841 painting by American Henry Inman

Transport
 Newsboy, an airplane that delivered newspapers for the McCook Gazette in Nebraska, U.S.
 Newsboy, a steam schooner acquired in 1895 by American Robert Dollar
 Newsboy, a 1994 bicycle model made by Merlin

Other
 Newsboy model or newsvendor model, a demand-forecasting model in operations management
 Newsboys, a brand of cigar made by Brown Brothers Tobacco Company
 Newsboy, a horse that raced in the 1882 Kentucky Derby

See also
 Newsboy cap, a casual-wear cap similar in style to the flat cap
 Newsboy Legion, a fictional kid gang in the DC Comics Universe
 Newsboys' strike of 1899, for boys who sold newspapers on the street